Walther M. Gerdts, known as Mac Gerdts, is the designer of German-style board games such as Imperial, Imperial 2030, Antike and Hamburgum. His games introduced the concept of a rondel rather than dice as a mechanism for play. This is designed to prevent players from repeatedly taking the same action in quick succession without paying a cost.

Like many German board games, all of Gerdts' games include a mechanism designed to keep game length roughly within the specified time constraint. In Imperial, the game ends when a nation reaches the 25-point on the counting chart. In Hamburgum, the game ends when six churches are constructed.

Games
 Antike Duellum, released in 2012, is a two-player version of Antike.
 Antike II, released in 2014, is the follow-up of Antike, modified to make conquests easier while also allowing players to have possibilities of winning without necessarily attacking other players.
 Antike, released in 2005, is about evolution and competition among ancient civilizations.
 Concordia, a game released in 2013, about economics during the Roman Empire, is one of Mac's few games that does not employ a rondel. It was nominated for the 2014 Spiel des Jahres prize in the category Kennerspiel des Jahres (Connoisseur-Enthusiast Game of the Year).
 Hamburgum, released in 2007, is a game in which the object is to trade goods and make prestigious church donations. The spaces on the rondel are Church, Trade, Cloth, Guildhall, Beer, Dockyard, and Sugar.
 Imperial 2030, released in 2009, is a follow-up of Imperial, where USA, Europe, Russia, China, India and Brazil compete for world domination.
 Imperial, a 2006 game, has the players take on the roles of international investors in pre-World War I Europe.
 Navegador, released in 2010, is a game about the Golden Age of Portuguese Explorations.
 The Princes of Machu Picchu, released in 2008
 Transatlantic, a historic/economic game about industry exploration and naval transportation was presented at Essen Spiel 2014 and released in 2017.

References

External links
 
 

Living people
Year of birth missing (living people)
Board game designers